Motherboard Monitor is a utility designed by Alexander Van Kaam for Microsoft Windows. It provides live information about the state of a motherboard and other hardware, including temperatures, voltages, fan speeds, and more.

On July 6, 2004, it was announced that development on Motherboard Monitor has been stopped. However, on September 13, 2006, a new update (Update 2) was released adding slightly more compatibility with new motherboards.

On December 8, 2006, a new update (Update 3) was released to add compatibility with Intel's Core/Core2/Core i7(preliminary) Digital Thermal Sensors via a plugin.

Current alternatives to Motherboard Monitor include Open Hardware Monitor, Argus Monitor and SpeedFan.

See also
Argus Monitor
SpeedFan
System monitor

References

Motherboard
Computer performance
System monitors